Alambay is a rural locality (a station) and the administrative center of Alambaysky Selsoviet of Zarinsky District, Altai Krai, Russia. The population was 502 as of 2016. There are 10 streets.

Geography 
The station is located in the east of the Zarinsky District, 70 km from Zarinsk.

References 

Rural localities in Zarinsky District